Caxamarca is a genus of flowering plants in the daisy family, Asteraceae.

 Species
 Caxamarca ayabacensis S.Leiva, Zapata & M.O.Dillon
 Caxamarca sanchezii M.O.Dillon & Sagást. - Peru

References

External links 

Senecioneae
Asteraceae genera
Flora of South America